Filemona F. Indire (born March 1930) is a politician from Kenya. He served as a nominated Member of the Parliament of Kenya between 1983 and 1988. He was also Kenya's ambassador to Russia (then called, the Soviet Union) in the 1960s, during Kenya's first president Jomo Kenyatta's tenure. After that, he served as a lecturer at the University of Nairobi.

Indire is also an influential Quaker, having served as Chairman of the Friend's World Committee for Consultation Africa Section, a Quaker organization that works to communicate between all parts of Quakerism in 1970s. He was also the Chairman of the National Council for Science and Technology in Nairobi, Kenya.

Personal life 
Indire is married to Abigail Indire, one of the first of 10 African-Kenyan girls to attend high school in Kenyas' history.

Works
Indire has written several books including A Comprehensive High School Curriculum Proposal for Reviewing and Revising the Program of Chavakali Secondary School, Maragoli, Kenya (1962) This study centered on the development of a curriculum which would assist in adequately meeting the needs of high school students in Western Kenya. Another study that Indire wrote, was a series of 15 books in collaboration with John W. Hanson, Secondary Level Teachers: Supply and Demand in Kenya.

The study, published in 1971, was a report on the supply of secondary level teachers in Kenya. It focused on the problem of forecasting the likely demand for non-Kenyan personnel for staffing secondary level institutions up to the year 1975, and it attempted to analyze the very real problem (at the time) of teacher supply within the context of the social and economic conditions of Kenya during the period leading up to the mid-1970s. Other topics examined included the projected expansion of other types of secondary-level education, programs for the preparation of teachers, major factors in teacher recruitment and retention, projected gaps in the teaching force, priorities in the provision and use of expatriate teachers, and recommendations of primary concern to Kenyan authorities of the day.

Davy Koech Commission Report

Indire was a member of the Commission of Inquiry into the Education System of Kenya commonly referred to as the Davy Koech Commission. The commission was established on 15 May 1998, by the president of Kenya at the time, Daniel Arap Moi.

Bibliography

References

http://erepository.uonbi.ac.ke/handle/11295/89063
http://erepository.uonbi.ac.ke/handle/11295/89065
http://erepository.uonbi.ac.ke/handle/11295/89061
http://erepository.uonbi.ac.ke/handle/11295/89064
http://oris.nacosti.go.ke/modules/library/publications/research_reports/NACOSTI-DL-RR-1039.pdf
http://erepository.uonbi.ac.ke/handle/11295/8022/browse?value=Indire%2C+Filemona+F&type=author

External links
https://www.youtube.com/watch?v=fPfPAnbOBZ0

1930 births
Living people
Members of the National Assembly (Kenya)
Ambassadors of Kenya to the Soviet Union